A list of horror films released in 1979.

References

Sources

 

 

  

Lists of horror films by year